Lissone-Muggiò is a railway station in Italy. Located on the Milan–Chiasso railway, it serves the towns of Lissone and Muggiò.

Services
Lissone-Muggiò is served by lines S9 and S11 of the Milan suburban railway network, operated by the Lombard railway company Trenord.

See also
 Milan suburban railway network

References

External links

Railway stations in Lombardy
Milan S Lines stations
Railway stations opened in 1882
Lissone